Animal Heart is the debut studio album by Nina Persson, singer of The Cardigans, released on February 10, 2014 through Lojinx in Europe and The End Records in North America. A video for the title track of the album was released in November 2013.

Critical reception

Initial critical reception of the album has been generally positive. At Metacritic, which assigns a normalized rating out of 100 to reviews from mainstream critics, the album received an average score of 68, based on 10 reviews, which indicates "generally favorable reviews".

Track listing

Personnel
Credits adapted from AllMusic.
Musicians
 Nina Persson – vocal and instrumental performance, production
 Nathan Larson – bass guitar, electric guitar, lap steel guitar, percussion, pump organ, synthesizer, vibraphone, background vocals, engineer, production
 Eric D. Johnson – autoharp, bass guitar, acoustic guitar, electric guitar, lap steel guitar, percussion, piano, pump organ, synthesizer, background vocals, engineer, production
 Brian Kantor – drums (1 to 5, 7 to 9, 11, 12)
 Bengt Lagerberg – drums (6, 10)

Technical personnel
 Sophie Bille Brahe – illustration
 Kalle Gustafsson – engineer
 Annele Hencz – publicity
 Nicholas Johansson – A&R
 Fred Kevorkian – mastering
 Joe McGinty – engineer
 Thom Monahan – mixing
 Staffan Persson – engineer
 Jörgen Ringstrand – photography
 Geoff Sanoff – engineer
 Barry Taylor – management
 Jessica Weitz – management

Album charts

Release history

References

2014 debut albums
Nina Persson albums
Lojinx albums
The End Records albums